Yapyguara fusca is a species of beetle in the family Cerambycidae, and the only species in the genus Yapyguara. It was described by Galileo and Martins in 2012.

References

Forsteriini
Beetles described in 2012